Iron Angel is a German heavy metal band from Hamburg.

History

Early years, reunion and split (1980–2007) 
The band's origins can be traced back to 1980 when drummer Mike Matthes and bassist Thorsten Lohmann were in a school band called Metal Gods, taken from the Judas Priest song of the same name. In 1983, they formed their own band, with guitarists Peter Wittke and Sven Strüven as additional members. They began to audition for a vocalist, in which Dirk Schröder was present at the time. With no other vocalists meeting their needs, Schröder was selected. The band was then known as Iron Angel, which was inspired by a novel about a spirit hunter. Three demos were recorded in 1984, with one of them being the result of the band's signing to SPV/Steamhammer. Their debut album Hellish Crossfire was released in 1985, which received critical acclaim and became known in the German speed metal scene. In 1986, bassist Thorsten Lohmann departed the band and was replaced with Günther Moritz as their temporary member for the tour with King Diamond in Germany, prior to the next album Winds of War, which was released in June 1986. The album's style was slightly different than its predecessor. It is explained that the members debated about the band's musical direction, which resulted in rising tensions until mid 1986. Iron Angel then decided to call it quits.

After a small jam session between Peter Wittke, Dirk Schröder and Mike Matthes, Iron Angel reformed in 1997 as a 4-piece band, with the addition of Günther Moritz as the new member. They were in the midst of finishing recording of what was to be their third album titled The Rebirth, and then begin work on a talked about fourth album which was to be titled Vier, however in 2000, Wittke died in a car accident and Moritz left the band, thus eliminating the possibility of both albums being released. A self released demo titled Back from Hell was released in May 2007, consisting of only Schröder and Matthes. It was composed of potential material for their intended comeback album from the early 2000s. The band disbanded again that year as they could not find any suitable new members. In 2008, Sven Strüven died of a heroin overdose.

Second reformation (2014–present) 
In October 2014, Iron Angel was reformed once again. They performed at the Headbangers Open Air and in South America in 2015 to great success, and at the Metal Magic Festival in 2016. In 2017, the band returned to the studio to record the third studio album titled Hellbound, which was released in May 2018, marking their first full-length offering in 32 years. In support of the album, they toured throughout Europe, with shows in North and South America, as well as Japan, being the headlining act for most of their shows.

The fourth album Emerald Eyes was released on 2 October 2020.

Influence and musical style 
Iron Angel's musical approach is influenced by bands such as Motörhead, Slayer and Judas Priest, according to former drummer Mike Matthes, "We wanted to try to connect speed metal with melodic elements, what was not asked at the time yet, unfortunately, but later it was done by bands like Helloween and then was also accepted by the fans. I am also of the opinion that we were not a thrash metal band, but a speed metal one." He then recalled a show in Belgium where Kreator vocalist/guitarist Mille Petrozza told Matthes that Iron Angel was "the worst thrash metal band, but the best speed metal band from Germany."

Band 
Current members
Dirk Schröder – vocals (1983–1986, 1997–2007, 2014–present)
Robert Altenbach – guitars (2016–present)
Nino Helfrich – guitars (2019–present)
Didy Mackel – bass (2014–present)
Maximilian Behr – drums (2017–present)

Former members
Thorsten Lohmann – bass (1983–1986)
Mike Matthes – drums (1983–1986, 1997–2007, 2014–2015), bass, guitars (2000–2007)
Peter "Piet" Wittke – guitars (1983–1986, 1997–2000) (died 2000)
Sven Strüven – guitars (1983–1986) (died 2008)
Günther Moritz – bass (1997–2000)
Alexander "Schrotti" Kokatt – drums (2015–2017)
Joachim Folta – guitars (2014–2016)
Mitsch Meyer – guitars (2014–2019)

Live musicians
Günther Moritz – bass (1986)

Discography 
Power Metal Attack (demo 1984)
Legions of Evil (demo 1984)
Hellish Crossfire (1985)
Winds of War (1986)
Rush of Power (2000) – first demo on LP
The Tapes (2004) – live 1986, Germany Tour with King Diamond
Rush of Power (2004) – live 1985 Warpke Open Air
Back from Hell (demo 2007)
Hellbound (2018)
Emerald Eyes (2020)

References

External links 
Official website

Musical groups established in 1983
Musical groups disestablished in 2007
German speed metal musical groups
German heavy metal musical groups